Alejandro Núñez Alonso (1905 – 7 October 1982) was a Spanish historical novelist, journalist and screenwriter.

Spanish novelists
Spanish male novelists
People from Gijón
1905 births
1982 deaths
20th-century Spanish novelists
20th-century Spanish male writers